The Hurn Museum is a museum on Monterey Square in Savannah, Georgia, United States, devoted to American folk art, as well as the work of international self-taught artists.  The museum is named after the late Deborah Hurn, a local champion of folk art in Savannah.

The museum was opened in November 2004 by the Sottile family.  The museum was viewed as controversial because it rejected the handicraft definition of folk art in favour of fine art. "Fine art separated the decorative arts years ago. We have to do the same with folk art" said co-founder Michael Sottile.

References

External links
www.hurnmuseum.org Official web site

Museums in Savannah, Georgia
Folk art museums and galleries in Georgia (U.S. state)
Monterey Square (Savannah) buildings
Savannah Historic District